Asclepiades of Antioch was Patriarch of Antioch and martyr. He succeeded Serapion as Patriarch of Antioch in 211. He was given the title of martyr, due to the trials he endured during Roman persecution.

See also
 Paul of Samosata

References

217 deaths
Syrian Christian saints
3rd-century Christian martyrs
3rd-century archbishops
Patriarchs of Antioch
Year of birth unknown